The Woori Bank Museum is a numismatics museum in Seoul, South Korea.

External links
Official site

See also

List of museums in South Korea

Museums in Seoul
Numismatic museums in Asia
Bank museums